The 1995 Skate Canada International was the second event of five in the 1995–96 ISU Champions Series, a senior-level international invitational competition series. It was held in Saint John, New Brunswick on November 2–5. Medals were awarded in the disciplines of men's singles, ladies' singles, pair skating, and ice dancing. Skaters earned points toward qualifying for the 1995–96 Champions Series Final.

Results

Men

Ladies

Pairs

Ice dancing

References

Skate Canada International, 1995
Skate Canada International
1995 in Canadian sports 
1995 in New Brunswick